Gifan Rural District is a rural district (dehestan) in Garmkhan District, Bojnord County, North Khorasan Province, Iran. At the 2006 census, its population was 10,439, in 2,386 families.  The rural district has 22 villages.

References 

Rural Districts of North Khorasan Province
Bojnord County